Below are links to lists of institutions of higher education in the United States (colleges and universities) by state, grouped by Census Region, as well as lists of institutions in United States insular areas and of American institutions located outside the United States and its territories.

Northeast

Connecticut
Maine
Massachusetts
New Hampshire
New Jersey
New York
Pennsylvania
Rhode Island
Vermont

Midwest

Illinois
Indiana
Iowa
Kansas
Michigan
Minnesota
Missouri
Nebraska
North Dakota
Ohio
South Dakota
Wisconsin

South

Alabama
Arkansas
Delaware
Florida
Georgia
Kentucky
Louisiana
Maryland
Mississippi
North Carolina
Oklahoma
South Carolina
Tennessee
Texas
Virginia
West Virginia

West

Alaska
Arizona
California
Colorado
Hawaii
Idaho
Montana
Nevada
New Mexico
Oregon
Utah
Washington
Wyoming

Washington, D.C.
Washington, D.C.

Insular areas

Guam
Puerto Rico
U.S. Virgin Islands

Note:
 American Samoa (American Samoa Community College) and the Northern Mariana Islands (Northern Marianas College) have one college each.
 The US insular areas under the Compact of Free Association, namely Palau (Palau Community College), the Federated States of Micronesia (College of Micronesia-FSM), and the Marshall Islands (College of the Marshall Islands) have one college each.
 The United States Minor Outlying Islands do not have any colleges or universities.

Outside the U.S. and its territories

The following list contains international institutions of higher education that are accredited or licensed in the United States. The list includes satellite campuses of universities headquartered within the United States.

American College Dublin
American College of Thessaloniki (ACT)
American College of Greece
American InterContinental University
American University in Bosnia and Herzegovina
American University in Bulgaria
The American University in Cairo
American University in Dubai
American University of Antigua
American University of Armenia
American University of Beirut
American University of Paris
American University of Rome
American University of Sharjah
American University of Nigeria
Central European University
Franklin University Switzerland
Girne American University
George Mason University (Incheon campus)
Hellenic American University
Hult International Business School
John Cabot University
Kean University (Wenzhou campus)
Keiser University (Latin American campus)
Lakeland University (Japan campus)
Lebanese American University
McDaniel College Budapest
New York University (Abu Dhabi campus)
New York University (Buenos Aires campus)
New York University (Florence campus)
Richmond, The American International University in London
RIT Kosovo / American University in Kosovo
Rochester Institute of Technology (Dubai campus)
Saint Louis University (Madrid campus)
Schiller International University
St. John's University (Italy campus)
St. John's University (Paris campus)
Stony Brook University (Korea campus)
Temple University (Rome campus)
Temple University (Japan campus)
University of Maryland Global Campus
University of Utah (Incheon campus)
Webster University Geneva (Geneva campus)
United States International University

See also
G.I. American universities
Ivy League universities
List of community colleges
List of current and historical women's universities and colleges in the United States
List of defunct military academies in the United States
List of dental schools in the United States
List of historically black colleges and universities
List of law schools in the United States
List of leaders of universities and colleges in the United States
List of liberal arts colleges in the United States
List of medical schools in the United States
List of online colleges in the United States
List of the largest United States colleges and universities by enrollment
Lists of universities and colleges
Men's colleges in the United States
Women's colleges in the United States

External links
U.S. Department of Education College Navigator

Unite
Lists of universities and colleges by country